Gora Aur Kala is a 1972 Indian Hindi-language film, produced by Rajkumar Kohli and directed by Naresh Kumar. The film stars Rajendra Kumar in a double role, Hema Malini, Rekha, Premnath, Prem Chopra, Madan Puri and Jagdeep. The film's music is by Laxmikant–Pyarelal. The movie is a remake of the 1971 Tamil movie Neerum Neruppum, which was based on the 1844 French novella The Corsican Brothers, by Alexandre Dumas.

Plot
Conjoined twin brothers are born in a royal family, but are separated at birth. Though they are twins, one has a blood disorder so his skin discolors and his left arm is paralyzed. Years later they discover each other and unite to free their kingdom from the traitors.

Cast
Rajendra Kumar as Karan Singh / Kali Singh (Kalua)
Hema Malini as Rajkumari Anuradha Singh
Rekha as Phoolwati
Prem Nath as Prithvi Singh
Prem Chopra as Shamsher Singh
Madan Puri as Raja Zohravar Singh (Anuradha's Father)
Jagdeep as Munna Singh / Chunni Singh
Sulochana Latkar as Maharani
Kamal Kapoor as Dilawar Singh
Sunder as Kotwal Sarju Singh
Ram Mohan as Hariya
Rajan Haksar as Randhir Singh
Dev Kumar as Maharaja
Kamaldeep as Villager

Soundtrack
Lyrics by Anand Bakshi.

References

External links 
 

1972 films
Hindi remakes of Tamil films
Films scored by Laxmikant–Pyarelal
1970s Hindi-language films
Twins in Indian films
Films based on The Corsican Brothers